Coleophora triplicis is a moth of the family Coleophoridae. It is found in Canada, including New Brunswick and Nova Scotia. This species has also been recorded on Prince Edward Island in a salt marsh ecosystem. In Prince Edward Island, it was observed as a predator of the predispersed seeds of the Gulf of Saint Lawrence aster (Symphyotrichum laurentianum Fernald).

The larvae feed on the seeds of Solidago sempervirens. They create a trivalved, tubular silken case.

References

triplicis
Moths of North America
Moths described in 1940